The first Congress of Visegrád was a 1335 summit in Visegrád in which Kings John I of Bohemia, Charles I of Hungary and Casimir III of Poland formed an anti-Habsburg alliance. The three leaders agreed to create new commercial routes to bypass the staple port of Vienna, which made merchants offer their goods there before they could try elsewhere, and to obtain easier access to other European markets.

The summit was triggered by the sudden expansion of Habsburg power in the region, which had taken over Carinthia and Carniola after the death of duke Henry of Gorizia-Tyrol, who had unsuccessfully claimed the Bohemian and the Polish crowns.

It also recognized Czech sovereignty over the Duchy of Silesia, which the Czech kings had controlled de jure with the Crown of Poland. John I relinquished the Polish crown to Casimir III in exchange for 1,200,000 Prague groschen. The Duchy of Silesia thus became part of the Czech Crown until 1742, when most of it was lost to Prussia and joined Poland after World War II in 1945. A small part is now in the Czech Republic.

A second meeting took place in 1339 and chose the new king of Poland.

See also
 Congress of Visegrád (1339)
 Visegrád Group
 Treaty of Trentschin
 Treaty of Namslau

External links
 RÁCZ, György. Visegrád 1335 [online]. Bratislava: International Visegrad Fund, 2009, [cit. 2013-08-02]. On-line book. (CZ, SK, HU, PL, EN, Latin)

Visegrad
Visegrad
1335 in Europe
14th century in Bohemia
14th century in Hungary
14th century in Poland